Otto Linné Erdmann (11 April 1804 – 9 October 1869) was a German chemist. He was the son of Karl Gottfried Erdmann, the physician who introduced vaccination into Saxony.

He was born in Dresden on 11 April 1804. In 1820 he began to attend the medico-chirurgical academy of his native place, and in 1822 he entered the University of Leipzig, where in 1827 he became an associate professor, and in 1830 a full professor of chemistry. This office he held until his death, which happened at Leipzig on 9 October 1869.

He was particularly successful as a teacher, and the laboratory established at Leipzig under his direction in 1843 was long regarded as a model institution. As an investigator he is best known for his work on nickel and indigo and other dye-stuffs. With R. F. Marchand (1813–1850) he also carried out a number of determinations of atomic weights.

In 1828 he founded the Journal für technische und ökonomische Chemie, which became in 1834 the Journal für praktische Chemie. From 1853 A. F. G. Werther (1815–1869) was an editor of the journal. Erdmann was also the author of Über das Nickel (1827), Lehrbuch der Chemie (1828), Grundriss der Waarenkunde (1833), and Über das Studium der Chemie (1861).

Notes

References
 

1804 births
1869 deaths
19th-century German chemists
Members of the First Chamber of the Diet of the Kingdom of Saxony
Scientists from Dresden
Academic staff of Leipzig University